Oxclose is an area of Washington, Tyne and Wear, England. It is located between the A1231, A182 and A195 highways, close to Sunderland, and is well served by links from the A1(M) which passes within  of Oxclose's boundaries.

There are two churches, a 'Multi-Purpose' Centre and a village centre which contains a shop, newsagents, fish and chip shop and a local pub called The Ox and Plough. It is also near to the Galleries Shopping Centre.

Education
There are four schools in Oxclose: Oxclose Nursery, Oxclose Primary School, St John Boste RC Primary School and Oxclose Community Academy.

The North East of England Japanese Saturday School (北東イングランド補習授業校 Hokutō Ingurando Hoshū Jugyō Kō), a Japanese weekend supplementary school, holds its classes in the Oxclose Community School.

References

External links
Washington.co.uk
Sunderland City Council
Official Website Of The Galleries
The Davy Lamp Folk Club
Oxclose Community School (Comprehensive) Official Website

Populated places in Tyne and Wear
Washington, Tyne and Wear